The Anglican Diocese of Sekondi  is a Ghanaian diocese of the Church of the Province of West Africa, a member church of the worldwide Anglican Communion. The current bishop is Alexander Kobina Asmah since 2016.

References

Anglican dioceses in Ghana
Dioceses of the Church of the Province of West Africa
Dioceses in Ghana
Anglican bishops of Sekondi